She Wronged Him Right is a 1934 Fleischer Studios animated short film starring Betty Boop. It marks the first appearance of Betty's semi-regular boyfriend, Fearless Fred.

This is the first of a series of Betty Boop melodrama spoofs, which also included Betty Boop's Prize Show (1934), No! No! A Thousand Times No!! (1935) and Honest Love and True (1938). The series was apparently inspired by the Terrytoons series of Fanny Zilch cartoons.

Plot
Betty Boop appears in a stage play, complete with obvious theatrical backdrops. Betty doesn't have the money to pay the mortgage, so the dastardly villain Heeza Rat threatens to foreclose unless Betty agrees to marry him. The villain threatens Betty in various ways, even almost drowning her until the handsome and muscular Fearless Fred comes to her rescue.

References

External links
She Wronged Him Right on Youtube
She Wronged Him Right at IMDB
She Wronged Him Right at Big Cartoon Database

1934 films
Betty Boop cartoons
1930s American animated films
American black-and-white films
1934 animated films
Paramount Pictures short films
Fleischer Studios short films
Short films directed by Dave Fleischer